Chitinophaga alhagiae is a Gram-negative and rod-shaped bacterium from the genus of Chitinophaga which has been isolated from rhizospheric soil from the plant Alhagi sparsifolia from Xinjiang in China.

References

Chitinophagia
Bacteria described in 2019